The Wasenhorn (German,) is a mountain of the Lepontine Alps, located on the border between Switzerland and Italy. It lies halfway between Brig (Swiss canton of Valais) and Varzo (Italian region of Piedmont), just north of Monte Leone, in the Simplon Pass area. Politically the Wasenhorn is split between the municipalities of Ried-Brig and Varzo.

The Simplon Tunnel runs into the massif of the Wasenhorn, below the subsidiary summit named Tunnelspitz.

Access road
Just follow to the road towards the Simplon pass, either from Brig on the Swiss side, or from Domodossola on the Italian side.

Climbing Route
The normal route to the summit of the Wasenhorn starts from the Monte Leone Hut of the Swiss Alpine Club, located on the south side of the mountain, above the Chaltwasser Pass, which connects the Simplon Pass with the Alpe Veglia.

To reach the hut from the Swiss side, there is a 2 hours 30 minute walk from the Simplon Hospiz which is at the Simplon pass road. From the hut to the summit takes a further one hour and thirty minutes.

An alternative, more technically demanding route to the summit of the Wasenhorn begins at the Mäderlücke – a pass between the Mäderhorn (2850 m) and the Wasenhorn – and runs along the south-western ridge of the Wasenhorn, featuring climbing sections up to UIAA grade II.

By continuing on towards the Aurona pass the Bivacco Farello is reached - a typical Alpine refuge.

Other mountains around to climb
From the Simplon pass, climbers can reach other nearby mountains:
 Breithorn (Simplon).
 Hubschhorn.
 Monte Leone.

References

External links

 Wasenhorn on Hikr
 Wasenhorn - Punta Terrarosa: route description on Mountains for Everybody

Mountains of the Alps
Alpine three-thousanders
Mountains of Switzerland
Mountains of Italy
Italy–Switzerland border
International mountains of Europe
Mountains of Valais
Lepontine Alps